Manon Apithy-Brunet (born 7 February 1996) is a French right-handed sabre fencer, 2018 team world champion, two-time Olympian, 2021 team Olympic silver medalist, and 2021 individual Olympic bronze medalist.

Personal life 
Brunet was born in Lyon, France. She is the only child of her parents. Her father, Philippe Brunet, played football for French Ligue 1 club Olympique Lyonnais. She began fencing at age seven at the Sabre au Clair club in Lyon, France. Her potential was soon noticed by the national training hub [Pole Espoir] in Orleans, France, which led to her joining the Cercle d'Escrime Orleanais club at the age of 15 and eventually the National Institute for Sport, Expertise and Performance [INSEP] in Paris, France.

Brunet started off with taekwondo and dancing but didn’t enjoy either of them. A friend of hers suggested that she try fencing. She was attracted to fencing at first because it was kind of funny. The idea of wearing some sort of disguise amused her. Brunet loved the idea of herself being the only girl at her fencing club 

Brunet got a degree in marketing at EDHEC Business School. Brunet married fellow french sabre fencer Boladé Apithy in 2021.

Medal Record

Olympic Games

World Championship

European Championship

Grand Prix

World Cup

References

External links
Official Facebook page

1996 births
Living people
French female sabre fencers
Fencers at the 2016 Summer Olympics
Fencers at the 2020 Summer Olympics
Olympic fencers of France
Olympic silver medalists for France
Olympic bronze medalists for France
Sportspeople from Lyon
Olympic medalists in fencing
Medalists at the 2020 Summer Olympics
21st-century French women